Saiyok Pumpanmuang (born October 22, 1983), formerly known as Saiyoknoi Sakchainarong (ไทรโยคน้อย ศักดิ์ชัยณรงค์), is a Thai welterweight kickboxer and Muay Thai fighter.

He is a former Lumpinee Stadium 154 lbs champion, Thailand 147 lbs champion, WMC 140 lbs champion and Rajadamnern Stadium 140 lbs champion. Saiyok rose to fame during his time with Thai Fight, participating in the inaugural Thai Fight Kard Chuek tournament in 2013 and winning the 2014 Thai Fight 72.5kg Tournament.

Biography and career 
Saiyok Pumpanmuang was born as Sakdaa Niamhom on October 22, 1983, in lower northern Thailand in Phitsanulok, the capital of Phitsanulok Province. He began boxing at the age of 11 in the Sor Riendek camp.

Career

Muay Thai 
Known as Saiyoknoi Sakchainarong during early years of his career, he rose to fame by winning three stadium titles including one from the prestigious Rajadamnern Stadium. Saiyok was considered in Thailand one of the most promising fighters in the heavier weight classes, however he fell from grace after losing his belts to Singmanee Sor Srisompong, in a controversial match seen by the thai media as fraud.

After the fight, promoters shied away from the disgraced fighter, forcing him to find another job and earn living as fruit merchant. He was taken in by a promoter at Lumpinee Stadium, Lieutenant General Sukkhatat Pumphanmuang, who decided to help Saiyok on his return to the sport.

Saiyok, took Lumpinee promoter’s last name as part of his new ring alias, and on March 7, 2008, at Lumpinee he won the vacant welterweight title of Thailand by second-round KO over Singsiri Por Sirichai.

On January 9, 2010  at the Society of Journalists annual awards show in Bangkok, Saiyok was awarded the Muaythai Ambassador of the Year award.

He faced Fabio Pinca at THAI FIGHT Extreme 2012: France on September 19, 2012, in Lyon, France, and won via decision after three rounds.

He fought Dylan Salvador in Roschtigrabe, Switzerland, on October 20, 2012, and lost by TKO after he could not continue due to a knee injury at the end of round one.

He outpointed Thiago Texeira at THAI FIGHT Extreme 2013: Muay Thai Day in Ayutthaya, Thailand, on February 23, 2013.

Saiyok was set to fight Chike Lindsay at Muaythai Superfight on May 13, 2013, but the bout was scrapped.

Saiyok will coach a team of farangs against a rival team trained by Sudsakorn Sor Klinmee on the reality television series Thai Fight Kard Chuek, to be shown over between July and August 2013 on Thailand's Channel 3. The two coaches will face off in December 2013.

He knocked out Mickaël Piscitello with a second-round elbow at THAI FIGHT Extreme 2013: Bangkok in Bangkok on June 29, 2013.

He KO'd Muhammad Nsubuga in round two at THAI FIGHT Extreme 2013: Pattani in Pattani, Thailand on September 22, 2013.

He beat Seyedisa Alamdarnezam by an extension round decision in a non-tournament match at the Thai Fight Semi-Finals in Bangkok, Thailand on November 30, 2013.

On December 22, 2013, he faced Sudsakorn Sor Klinmee at the 2013 Thai Fight Final for the inaugural Thai Fight 70 kg Kard Chuek Championship. He lost the fight by extension fourth-round decision.

Saiyok competed in his second Thai Fight tournament when he was entered into the Thai Fight 72.5 kg Championship. He defeated Alka Matewa in the semi-finals on November 22, 2014. On December 21, 2014, he defeated French phenom Antoine Pinto to become the inaugural Thai Fight 72.5 kg King's Cup Tournament Champion.

Lethwei 
On July 22, 2018, Saiyok faced Lethwei star Tun Tun Min, former Openweight Lethwei World Champion, under traditional Lethwei rules KO to win in Yangon, Myanmar. Both fighters showed immense heart, but left fans slightly disappointed since it ended in a draw because there was no knockout.

Titles and accomplishments

Kickboxing
 Kunlun Fight
 2019 Kunlun Fight 75 kg Tournament Runner-Up

Muay Thai
 World Muay Thai Organization (WMO)
 2015 WMO Muaythai 72 kg World Champion
 Thai Fight 
 2022 Thai Fight 72.5 kg Kard Chuek Runner-Up  
 2017 Thai Fight 72.5 kg Tournament Runner-Up 
 2014 Thai Fight 72.5 kg Tournament Champion
 2013 Thai Fight 70 kg Kard Chuek Tournament Runner-Up
 39–5 record
 Martial Arts Sports Association (MASA) 
 2012 MASA Junior Middleweight World Muay Thai Champion
 World Muaythai Council (WMC) 
 2012 WMC 4-Man Tournament Champion
 2006 WMC Super-lightweight Champion (140 lb)
 Lumpinee Stadium 
 2010 Lumpinee Stadium Super-welterweight (154 lb) Champion
 Professional Boxing Association of Thailand (PAT) 
 2008 Thailand Welterweight (147 lb) Champion
 Rajadamnern Stadium 
 2007 Rajadamnern Stadium Super-lightweight Champion (140 lb)
 Omnoi Stadium
 2007 Tamjai Superyak 8-Man Tournament Champion (143 lb)

Boxing
 World Boxing Council (WBC) 
 2014 WBC Asia Silver Welterweight Champion

Awards
 2010 Muaythai Ambassador of the Year
 Member of Thai Fight from 2011 to 2018 (31–5 record)

Muay Thai record 

|- style="background:#cfc;"
| 2023-02-26 || Win|| align="left" | Walid Otmane || THAI FIGHT Kon Rak Pathum|| Pathum Thani province, Thailand || Decision || 3 ||3:00
|- style="background:#cfc;"
| 2023-02-04 || Win|| align="left" | Kevin Bosah || THAI FIGHT Luang Phor Ruay|| Saraburi province, Thailand ||  KO || 2 ||
|- style="background:#fbb;"
| 2022-12-24|| Loss || align="left" | Thoeun Theara || Thai Fight: Metropolitan Police Bureau 100th Anniversary || Bangkok, Thailand || TKO (Doctor stoppage)|| 1 ||  
|- style="background:#CCFFCC;"
| 2022-11-20|| Win || align="left" | Samuel Andoche|| THAI FIGHT Vana Nava Hua Hin || Hua Hin district, Thailand || Decision || 3 || 3:00
|- style="background:#cfc;"
| 2022-10-16|| Win || align="left" | Thun Rithy Kun Khmer || THAI FIGHT Vajiravudh || Bangkok, Thailand || KO (Body kicks)||2  || 
|- style="background:#CCFFCC;"
| 2022-05-29|| Win || align="left" | Uzair Ismoiljonov || THAI FIGHT Nakhon Sawan || Nakhon Sawan, Thailand || TKO (3 Knockdown) || 1 || 
|- style="background:#CCFFCC;"
| 2022-05-08|| Win || align="left" | Jordan Watson|| THAI FIGHT Sung Noen || Sung Noen district, Thailand || Decision || 3 || 3:00
|-  style="background:#cfc;"
| 2022-04-17|| Win ||align=left| Keivan Soleimani || THAI FIGHT KonlakPathum || , Thailand || Ext R. Decision || 4 || 3:00
|- style="background:#cfc;"
| 2022-03-20|| Win || align="left" | Luiz Alves || THAI FIGHT Lampang || Lampang, Thailand || Decision || 3 || 3:00
|-  style="background:#cfc;"
| 2021-12-19|| Win ||align=left| Fahsai Changmuaythaigym || THAI FIGHT Khao Aor || Phatthalung, Thailand || KO || 2 ||
|-  style="background:#cfc;"
| 2021-07-04|| Win ||align=left| Jargo Aniste || THAI FIGHT Strong || Pattaya, Thailand || TKO (Referee stoppage/High kick) || 2 ||
|-  style="background:#cfc;"
| 2021-04-25|| Win ||align=left| Gligor Stojanov || THAI FIGHT DMHTT || Samut Sakhon, Thailand || KO || 2 ||
|-  style="background:#cfc;"
| 2021-04-03|| Win ||align=left| Piotr Lagodzki || THAI FIGHT Nan || Nan, Thailand || KO || 1 ||
|-  style="background:#cfc;"
| 2020-11-28|| Win ||align=left| Fabio Reis || THAI FIGHT Pluak Daeng || Rayong, Thailand || Decision || 3 ||
|-  style="background:#cfc;"
| 2020-11-07|| Win ||align=left| Alexandru Bublea || THAI FIGHT Korat 2020 || Nakhon Ratchasima, Thailand || Decision || 3 ||
|-
|-  style="background:#cfc;"
| 2020-10-17|| Win ||align=left| Atin Gaur || THAI FIGHT Begins || Nonthaburi, Thailand || TKO || 1 ||
|-  style="background:#fbb;"
|  2019-07-27 || Loss || align="left" | Vitaly Gurkov || Kunlun Fight 81 75 kg World Tournament (Finals ) || Beijing, China || Decision (Unanimous) || 3 || 3:00
|-
! style=background:white colspan=9 |
|-
|-  style="background:#cfc;"
|  2019-07-27 || Win|| align="left" | Jiao Fukai  || Kunlun Fight 81 75 kg World Tournament (1/2 Finals ) || Beijing, China || Decision (Majority)|| 3 || 3:00
|-
|-  style="background:#cfc;"
|  2019-07-27 || Win|| align="left" | Liu Xu  || Kunlun Fight 81 75 kg World Tournament (1/4 Finals ) || Beijing, China || Decision  || 3 || 3:00
|-  style="background:#fbb;"
| 2019-01-12|| Loss||align=left| Han Feilong || Emei Legend 36 ||China ||Decision|| 3 || 3:00
|-  style="background:#cfc;"
| 2018-06-02|| Win ||align=left| Yi Long  || Wu Lin Feng 2018: Yi Long VS Saiyok|| China || KO || 1 || 2:30
|-  style="background:#cfc;"
| 2018-04-21|| Win ||align=left| Saro Presti || THAI FIGHT Rome || Rome, Italy || Decision (Unanimous) || 3 || 3:00
|-  style="background:#fbb;"
| 2018-01-27|| Loss ||align=left| Chanajon P.K. Saenchai Muaythaigym || THAI FIGHT Bangkok || Bangkok, Thailand || KO || 2 ||
|-  style="background:#cfc;"
| 2017-12-23|| Win ||align=left| Martin Meoni || THAI FIGHT Chiang Mai  || Chiang Mai, Thailand || Decision || 3 || 3:00
|-  style="background:#fbb;"
| 2017-09-30|| Loss ||align=left| Youssef El Hadmi || THAI FIGHT Barcelona || Barcelona, Spain || Decision  || 3 || 3:00
|-  style="background:#cfc;"
| 2017-07-15|| Win ||align=left| Kyal Lin Aung || THAI FIGHT We Love Yala  || Yala, Thailand || TKO || 3 ||
|-  style="background:#cfc;"
| 2017-05-27|| Win ||align=left| Julian Imeri|| THAI FIGHT Italy || Turin, Italy || Decision || 3 ||
|-  style="background:#cfc;"
| 2017-04-29|| Win ||align=left|  Nick Price|| THAI FIGHT Samui 2017 || Ko Samui, Thailand || KO || 2 || 
|-  style="background:#fbb;"
| 2017-04-08|| Loss ||align=left| Raphaël Llodra || THAI FIGHT Paris || Paris, France || Decision || 3 || 3:00
|-  style="background:#fbb;"
| 2017-04-01|| Loss ||align=left| Chingiz Allazov || Wu Lin Feng 2017: China VS Europe || Zhengzhou, China || Decision (Unanimous) || 3 || 3:00
|-  style="background:#fbb;"
| 2017-01-14|| Loss ||align=left| Sun Weiqiang || Wu Lin Feng World Championship 2017 || Zhengzhou, China || Decision || 3 || 3:00
|-  style="background:#fbb;"
| 2016-12-24|| Loss ||align=left| Youssef Boughanem || THAI FIGHT The Fighter King || Thailand || Decision (Unanimous) || 3 || 3:00
|-  style="background:#cfc;"
| 2016-11-19|| Win ||align=left|  Lapawa Jedrzej||  THAI FIGHT AIR RACE 1 || Thailand || Decision (Unanimous) || 3 || 3:00
|-  style="background:#fbb;"
| 2016-09-11 || Loss ||align=left| Ben Hodge ||  THAI FIGHT London || London, United Kingdom || Decision || 3 || 3:00
|-  style="background:#fbb;"
| 2016-08-06 || Loss ||align=left| Zhang Kaiyin ||  Glory of Heroes 4 || Changzhi, China || Decision || 3 || 3:00
|-  style="background:#cfc;"
| 2016-07-23|| Win ||align=left|  Phan Khorun||  THAI FIGHT Proud to Be Thai || Thailand || KO || 1 || 3:00
|-  style="background:#cfc;"
| 2016-06-25|| Win ||align=left|  Dzmitry Filipau||  Kunlun Fight 46 || Kunming, China || Decision (Unanimous) || 3 || 3:00
|-  style="background:#cfc;"
| 2016-04-30|| Win ||align=left| Imad Assli||  THAI FIGHT Samui 2016 || Ko Samui, Thailand || Decision (Unanimous) || 3 || 3:00
|-  style="background:#fbb;"
| 2016-04-09 || Loss ||align=left| Serginio Kanters  || Kunlun Fight 40 - 70 kg World Max 2016 Group H Tournament Semi Finals]] || Xining, China || Ext R. Decision || 4 || 3:00
|-  style="background:#cfc;"
| 2016-03-19|| Win ||align=left| Reinaldo Oliveira ||  THAI FIGHT Korat || Korat, Thailand || KO || 1 || 3:00
|-  style="background:#cfc;"
| 2016-03-12|| Win ||align=left| Matthew Richardson ||  THAI FIGHT || Bangkok, Thailand || Decision (Unanimous) || 3 || 3:00
|-  style="background:#cfc;"
| 2015-12-31|| Win ||align=left| Daniel Kerr ||  THAI FIGHT Count Down || Bangkok, Thailand || Decision || 3 || 3:00
|-  style="background:#cfc;"
| 2015-11-21|| Win ||align=left| Omar Yilmaz ||  THAI FIGHT RPCA || Nakhon Pathom, Thailand || KO || 1 || 3:00
|-  style="background:#cfc;"
| 2015-10-24|| Win ||align=left| Alain Sylvestre ||  THAI FIGHT Vietnam || Ho Chi Minh City, Vietnam || KO || 1 || 3:00
|-  style="background:#cfc;"
| 2015-10-03 || Win ||align=left|Hu Yafei ||  Wu Lin Feng World Championship 2015 || China ||Ext R. Decision || 4 || 3:00
|-  style="background:#cfc;"
| 2015-09-17|| Win ||align=left|Roman Babaev ||  THAI FIGHT Moscow || Moscow, Russia || Decision || 3 || 3:00
|-  style="background:#cfc;"
| 2015-08-22 || Win ||align=left|Yassin El Hana ||  THAI FIGHT Narathiwat|| Narathiwat, Thailand || Decision || 3 || 3:00
|-  style="background:#cfc;"
| 2015-07-18 || Win ||align=left|Carl N'Diaye ||  THAI FIGHT Shaolin || Zhengzhou, China || TKO || 3 || 3:00
|-  style="background:#cfc;"
| 2015-05-02|| Win ||align=left| Yurik Davtyan || THAI FIGHT Samui 2015 || Ko Samui, Thailand  || KO ||2|| 
|-  style="background:#cfc;"
| 2015-04-04 || Win ||align=left| Remy Vectol || THAI FIGHT CRMA || Nakhon Nayok, Thailand || Decision || 3 ||3:00
|-  style="background:#cfc;"
| 2015-02-28 || Win ||align=left| Diogo Calado || Ring War 2015 || Sesto San Giovanni, Italy || TKO || 2 || 
|-
! style=background:white colspan=9 |
|-  style="background:#cfc;"
| 2014-12-21 || Win||align=left| Antuan Siangboxing || THAI FIGHT Final - 72.5 kg Tournament || Bangkok, Thailand || Decision  || 3 || 3:00
|-
! style=background:white colspan=9 |
|-  style="background:#cfc;"
| 2014-11-22 || Win ||align=left| Alka Matewa || THAI FIGHT - 72.5 kg Tournament Semi-Finals || Thailand || KO || 1 ||
|-  style="background:#cfc;"
| 2014-06-28 ||Win ||align=left| Alka Matewa || THAI FIGHT WORLD BATTLE 2014: Macau || Macau, China || Decision || 3 || 
|-  style="background:#cfc;"
| 2014-04-06 ||Win ||align=left| Chanajon P.K. Saenchai Muaythaigym || THAI FIGHT WORLD BATTLE 2014: Chakrinaruebet || Sattahip, Thailand || KO (left elbow) || 3 || 
|-  style="background:#fbb;"
| 2013-12-22 || Loss ||align=left| Sudsakorn Sor Klinmee  || THAI FIGHT Kard Chuek - Final || Bangkok, Thailand || Ext R. Decision || 4 || 
|-  style="background:#cfc;"
| 2013-11-30 || Win ||align=left| Seyedisa Alamdarnezam || THAI FIGHT Kard Chuek - Semi-Finals || Bangkok, Thailand || Ext R. Decision || 4 || 
|-  style="background:#cfc;"
| 2013-09-22 || Win ||align=left| Muhammad Nsubuga || THAI FIGHT EXTREME 2013: Pattani || Pattani, Thailand || KO || 2 || 
|-  style="background:#cfc;"
| 2013-07-29 ||Win ||align=left| Youssef Boughanem || THAI FIGHT Kard Chuek, Quarter-Finals || Bangkok, Thailand || Decision || 3 || 3:00
|-  style="background:#cfc;"
| 2013-06-29 ||Win ||align=left| Mickaël Piscitello || THAI FIGHT EXTREME 2013: Bangkok || Bangkok, Thailand || KO (left elbow) || 2 || 
|-  style="background:#cfc;"
| 2013-02-23 || Win ||align=left| Thiago Texeira || THAI FIGHT EXTREME 2013: Muay Thai Day || Ayutthaya, Thailand || Decision (unanimous) || 3 || 3:00
|-  style="background:#cfc;"
| 2012-11-24 ||Win||align=left| Wilfried Montagne || Frank Lee's Muay Thai Mayhem 3 || Edmonton, Alberta, Canada || Decision || 5 || 3:00
|-  style="background:#fbb;"
| 2012-10-20 ||Loss||align=left| Dylan Salvador || Roschtigrabe Derby || Roschtigrabe, Switzerland || TKO (knee injury) || 1 || 3:00
|-  style="background:#cfc;"
| 2012-09-19 || Win ||align=left| Fabio Pinca || THAI FIGHT Lyon || Lyon, France || Decision || 3 || 3:00
|-  style="background:#cfc;"
| 2012-08-17 || Win ||align=left| Craig Jose || THAI FIGHT EXTREME 2012: England || Leicester, England || Decision || 3 || 3:00
|-  style="background:#cfc;"
| 2012-06-23 || Win ||align=left| Michael Demetriou || Conquest II || Orange, New South Wales || Decision (Unanimous)  || 5 || 3:00
|-
! style=background:white colspan=9 |
|-  style="background:#fbb;"
| 2012-05-27 || Loss ||align=left| Mohamed Khamal || SLAMM: Nederland vs. Thailand VII || Almere, Netherlands || TKO (Doctor stop/cut by elbow) || 2 || 
|-  style="background:#cfc;"
| 2012-04-03 || Win ||align=left| Jordan Watson || WMC Tournament, Final || Bangkok, Thailand || Decision  || 5 || 3:00
|-
! style=background:white colspan=9 |
|-  style="background:#cfc;"
| 2012-04-03 || Win ||align=left| Vuyisile Colossa || WMC Tournament, Semi Final || Bangkok, Thailand || Decision  || 3 || 3:00
|-  style="background:#cfc;"
| 2012-03-10 || Win ||align=left| Sofian Seboussi || RMB : France vs Thailand 2012 || Ile-Saint-Denis, France || Decision  || 5 || 3:00
|-  style="background:#cfc;"
| 2011-12-18 || Win ||align=left| Hicham Chaibi || THAI FIGHT 2011 || Bangkok, Thailand || Decision  || 3 || 3:00
|-  style="background:#cfc;"
| 2011-10-08 || Win ||align=left| Mauro Serra || Muay Thai Premier League 2nd Round || Padua, Italy || Decision  || 3 || 3:00
|-  style="background:#cfc;"
| 2011-08-07 || Win ||align=left| Kou Suman || THAI FIGHT EXTREME 2011: Japan || Tokyo, Japan || Decision || 3 || 3:00
|-  style="background:#cfc;"
| 2011-07-23 || Win ||align=left| Bruce Macfie || Thailand Versus Challenger Series 2011 || Bangkok, Thailand || Decision (Unanimous) || 5 || 3:00
|-  style="background:#cfc;"
| 2011-05-31 || Win ||align=left| Andrei Kulebin || Fight Factory Arena 2011 || Hong Kong || TKO  || 1 || 1:38
|-  style="background:#cfc;"
| 2011-05-14 || Win ||align=left| Ibrahima Njie Jarra || THAI FIGHT EXTREME 2011: France || Cannes, France || TKO  || 1 || 
|-  style="background:#cfc;"
| 2011-04-10 || Win ||align=left| Fahsuriya Sor Por Por Lao || Muay Khat-Chuak in Inter-Mekhon || Cambodia || KO || 3 || 
|- |-  bgcolor="#CCFFCC"
| 2011-03-19 || Win ||align=left| Laemthong Thor Ponchai || Sinbi-Muay Thai || Phuket, Thailand || Decision || 5 || 
|-  style="background:#cfc;"
| 2010-12-05 || Win ||align=left| Cédric Muller || Thailand King's Birthday || Bangkok, Thailand || TKO || 4 || 
|-  style="background:#cfc;"
| 2010-10-29 || Win ||align=left| Abdallah Mabel || France vs Lumpinee || Paris, France || Decision || 5 || 3:00
|-
! style=background:white colspan=9 |
|-  style="background:#cfc;"
| 2010-08-12 || Win ||align=left| Antuan Siangboxing || Thailand vs Challenger Onesongchai Series, Sanam Luang || Bangkok, Thailand || Decision (Unanimous) || 5 || 3:00
|-  style="background:#cfc;"
| 2010-08-06 || Win ||align=left| Bakhulule Baai || || Phuket, Thailand || KO  || 3 ||
|-  style="background:#cfc;"
| 2010-07-29 || Win ||align=left| Sekou Dembele || Thepprasit Fairtex Stadium || Pattaya, Thailand || Decision (Unanimous)  || 5 || 3:00
|-  style="background:#cfc;"
| 2010-04-10 || Win ||align=left| Edgar N'Zunga || Star Muaythai V || Maastricht, Netherlands || KO || 4 || 
|-  style="background:#cfc;"
| 2010-02-26 || Win ||align=left| Farid Villaume || Lumpinee Stadium || Bangkok, Thailand || Decision (Unanimous) || 5 || 3:00
|-
! style=background:white colspan=9 |
|-  style="background:#cfc;"
| 2009-11-29 || Win ||align=left| Warren Stevelmans || SLAMM "Nederland vs Thailand VI" || Almere, Netherlands || Decision (Unanimous) || 5 || 3:00
|-  style="background:#cfc;"
| 2009-11-07 || Win ||align=left| Armen Petrosyan || Janus FightNight: Thai Boxe Last Challenge || Padua, Italy || Decision (Unanimous) || 5 || 3:00
|-  style="background:#cfc;"
| 2009-10-17 || Win ||align=left| Bakhulule Baai || Muay Thai Mayhem : In the Beginning || Edmonton, Canada || TKO || 5 || 0:31
|-  style="background:#cfc;"
| 2009-09-26 || Win ||align=left| Samranchai 96 Penang || Battle of Sweden II || Stockholm, Sweden || Decision (Unanimous) || 5 || 3:00
|-  style="background:#cfc;"
| 2009-08-08 || Win ||align=left| Dmitry Ushkanov || Libogen Fight Night X: Chariots of Fire || Hong Kong || KO || || 
|-  style="background:#cfc;"
| 2009-05-30 || Win ||align=left| Harry Loodewijks || Star Muaythai IV || Maastricht, Netherlands || KO || 3 || 2:28
|-  style="background:#cfc;"
| 2009-05-09 || Win ||align=left| Rudolf Durica || C-4 Thaiboxing part 4 || Kristianstad, Sweden || Decision (Unanimous) || 5 || 3:00
|-  style="background:#cfc;"
| 2009-04-05 || Win ||align=left| Seamus Cogan || Chitalada Showdown II || Tampere, Finland || KO || 2 || 
|-  style="background:#cfc;"
| 2009-02-21 || Win ||align=left| Bruce Macfie || Libogen Fight Night IX || Hong Kong || KO || 2 ||
|-  style="background:#cfc;"
| 2009-01-02 || Win ||align=left| Samranchai 96 Penang || Lumpinee Stadium || Bangkok, Thailand || Decision (Unanimous) || 5 || 3:00
|-  style="background:#cfc;"
| 2008-11-29 || Win ||align=left| Fikri Tijarti || SLAMM "Nederland vs Thailand V" || Almere, Netherlands || Decision (Unanimous) || 5 || 3:00
|-  style="background:#cfc;"
| 2008-09-17 || Win ||align=left| Hicham Hachem || Libogen Fight Night VIII || Hong Kong || KO || 2 ||
|-  style="background:#cfc;"
| 2008-08-21 || Win ||align=left| K.Max || Libogen Fight Night VII || Hong Kong || Decision (Unanimous) || 3 || 3:00
|-  style="background:#cfc;"
| 2008-08-03 || Win ||align=left| Daisuke LuukHamakko || Muay Thai Wave from Yokohama7 || Yokohama, Japan || TKO 1R2 || 1 || 2:00
|-  style="background:#cfc;"
| 2008-06-08 || Win ||align=left| Ben Burton || Libogen Fight Night VI || Hong Kong || TKO || 1 ||
|-  style="background:#cfc;"
| 2008-03-07 || Win ||align=left| Singsiri Por Sirichai || Suk Pumphanmuang, Lumpinee Stadium || Bangkok, Thailand || KO (Left elbow) || 2 || 
|-
! style=background:white colspan=9 |
|-  style="background:#fbb;"
| 2007-10-27 || Loss ||align=left| Singmanee Sor Srisompong || Rajadamnern Stadium || Bangkok, Thailand || Decision || 5 || 3:00
|-
! style=background:white colspan=9 |
|-  style="background:#fbb;"
| 2007-04-30 || Loss ||align=left| Bigben Jor Rachadakon || Rajadamnern Stadium || Bangkok, Thailand || Decision || 5 || 3:00
|-  style="background:#cfc;"
| 2007-03-24 || Win ||align=left| Berneung Topkingboxing || Rajadamnern Stadium || Bangkok, Thailand || TKO || 5 || 
|-
! style=background:white colspan=9 |
|-  style="background:#cfc;"
| 2007-03-15 || Win ||align=left| Berneung Topkingboxing || Daowrungchujarern Fights, Rajadamnern Stadium || Bangkok, Thailand || Decision || 5 || 3:00

|-  style="background:#fbb;"
| 2006-12-21 || Loss||align=left| Jaroenchai Kesagym || Chujaroen + Jarumueang, Rajadamnern Stadium || Bangkok, Thailand || Decision || 5 || 3:00

|-  style="background:#cfc;"
| 2006-08-17 || Win ||align=left| Berneung Topkingboxing || Daorungchujaroen Fights, Rajadamnern Stadium || Bangkok, Thailand || TKO (Low kicks) || 4 || 
|-
! style=background:white colspan=9 |
|-  style="background:#cfc;"
| 2006-02-18 || Win ||align=left| Kiatthaksin Sor Damrong || Thamjai promotion, Omnoi Stadium || Bangkok, Thailand || TKO || 2 || 
|-  style="background:#cfc;"
| 2005-12-16 || Win ||align=left| Tawatchai Sitkriangkri || Siangmorakot Fights, Rajadamnern Stadium || Bangkok, Thailand || Decision || 5 || 3:00
|-  style="background:#fbb;"
| 2004- ||Loss ||align=left| Lakhin Wassandasit || Omnoi Stadium, Tam Jai Tournament Final || Bangkok, Thailand || KO (Punches) || 2 ||
|-
! style=background:white colspan=9 |
|-
| colspan=9 | Legend:

Lethwei record 

|- style="background:#c5d2ea;
| 2018-07-22 || Draw ||align=left| Tun Tun Min || 2018 Golden Belt Championship || Yangon, Myanmar || Draw || 5 || 3:00
|-
|-
| colspan=9 | Legend:

Boxing record 

|-  style="background:#cfc;"
| 2014-03-14 || Win ||align=left| You-Jie Zeng || Wat Khaolangpattana || Lop Buri, Thailand || RTD || 5 || || 2–0
|-
! style=background:white colspan=9 |
|-  style="background:#cfc;"
| 2013-04-09 || Win ||align=left| Muhammad Sapata || Chiranakorn Stadium || Songkhla, Thailand || KO || 2 || || 1–0
|-
| colspan=9 | Legend:

See also
List of male kickboxers

References

1983 births
Living people
Lightweight kickboxers
Welterweight kickboxers
Middleweight kickboxers
Saiyok Pumpanmuang
Saiyok Pumpanmuang
Kunlun Fight kickboxers
Saiyok Pumpanmuang